The Vanguard Visionaries series is a collection of artist sampler albums released by Vanguard Records to celebrate the company's 60th anniversary.

Vanguard Records had a high-profile during the 1960s folk revival for its catalogue of recordings by many pivotal folk and blues artists such as Joan Baez, Doc Watson, Odetta, John Fahey, and many others. The label first released a series of artist samplers from the 1960s and early-'70s era, later releasing more contemporary artists.

Releases 
 Vanguard Visionaries (Alison Brown album)
 Vanguard Visionaries (Sandy Bull album)
 Vanguard Visionaries (Ramblin' Jack Elliott album)
 Vanguard Visionaries (John Fahey album)
 Vanguard Visionaries (Odetta album)
 Vanguard Visionaries (Doc Watson album)

Other artists showcased

References

Vanguard Records albums